Johnstone's mastiff bat (Otomops johnstonei) is a species of bat in the Molossidae family endemic to Indonesia.

References

Otomops
Bats of Indonesia
Endemic fauna of Indonesia
Taxonomy articles created by Polbot
Mammals described in 1992
Taxa named by Darrell Kitchener